Stealer of Souls is a 1985 role-playing game adventure for Stormbringer published by Chaosium.

Plot summary
Stealer of Souls is the first part of a two-part adventure in which the player characters help avenge the death of the father of a young woman named Freyda.

Reception
Phil Frances reviewed Stealer of Souls for White Dwarf #77, giving it an overall rating of 8 out of 10, and stated that "Stealer Of Souls is the first Stormbringer supplement that I respect (even reading it is enjoyable). Its freshness will revive the palate of many a jaded GM, and it will pose a healthy challenge to an experienced group of characters."

Michael R. Jarrell reviewed Stealer of Souls in Space Gamer/Fantasy Gamer No. 81. Jarrell commented that "The game just doesn't cut the mustard. If you are a SBophile you'll want it. if you are looking for quality versus cash outlay you may be seriously disappointed as I was."

Reviews
Different Worlds #45 (March/April, 1987)

References

Fantasy role-playing game adventures
Role-playing game supplements introduced in 1985